Eucosmophora pouteriae is a moth of the family Gracillariidae. It is known from Costa Rica.

The length of the forewings is 3.2–3.6 mm for males and 3.7 mm for females.

The larvae feed on Pouteria campechiana. They mine the leaves of their host plant. The early mine is serpentine, yellow-tan, with a dark central frass line. The lower surface of the blotch mine is yellow-brown, and appears to be made well into the parenchyma as it is inconspicuous from both leaf surfaces initially. Mines are often formed close to the midrib. The blotch runs between adjacent lateral veins, but may cross over the veins when situated peripherally on the lamina. Tissue-feeding instars remove patches of parenchyma to the upper leaf surface. The cocoon is chocolate brown.

Etymology
The specific name is derived from the generic name, Pouteria, of the only recorded larval host.

References

Acrocercopinae
Moths described in 2005